Alloeochaete is a genus of African plants in the grass family.

 Species
 Alloeochaete andongensis (Rendle) C.E.Hubb. - Angola
 Alloeochaete geniculata Kabuye - Malawi 
 Alloeochaete gracillima Kabuye - Malawi 
 Alloeochaete namuliensis Chippind. - Mozambique 
 Alloeochaete oreogena Launert - Malawi 
 Alloeochaete ulugurensis Kabuye - Tanzania

See also 
 List of Poaceae genera

References

External links 

 Grassbase - The World Online Grass Flora

Poaceae genera
Grasses of Africa
Taxa named by Charles Edward Hubbard
Panicoideae